Tanka Tanka (Aymara tanka hat or biretta, the reduplication indicates that there is a group of something, "many hats (or birettas)", also spelled Tankha Tankha) is a  mountain in the Andes of Bolivia. It is located in the Oruro Department, San Pedro de Totora Province. Tanka Tanka lies at the Sulluma River, southeast of Lluqu Lluqu.

References 

Mountains of Oruro Department